Katharine Jefferts Schori (born March 26, 1954) is the former Presiding Bishop and Primate of the Episcopal Church of the United States. Previously elected as the 9th Bishop of the Episcopal Diocese of Nevada, she was the first woman elected as a primate in the Anglican Communion. Jefferts Schori was elected at the 75th General Convention on June 18, 2006, and invested at Washington National Cathedral on November 4, 2006, and continued until November 1, 2015, when Michael Bruce Curry was invested in the position. She took part in her first General Convention of the Episcopal Church as Presiding Bishop of The Episcopal Church in July 2009.

Early and family life
Of Irish and Swiss ancestry, Jefferts Schori was born in Pensacola, Florida to Keith Jefferts, an atomic physicist, and Elaine Ryan, a microbiologist. Jefferts Schori was first raised in the Catholic Church. In 1963, her parents brought her, at the age of eight, into the Episcopal Church (St. Andrew's Episcopal Church, New Providence, New Jersey) with their own move out of Roman Catholicism. Her mother converted to Eastern Orthodoxy a few years later and died in 1998.

Jefferts Schori attended school in New Jersey, then earned a Bachelor of Science degree in biology from Stanford University in 1974, a Master of Science degree in oceanography in 1977, and a Doctor of Philosophy degree in 1983, also in oceanography, from Oregon State University.  She is an instrument-rated pilot, and both her parents were pilots.

She married Richard Schori, an Oregon State professor of topology, in 1979; they have a daughter.

Early career
Jefferts Schori earned her Master of Divinity in 1994 from the Church Divinity School of the Pacific and was ordained priest that year. She served as assistant rector to William R. McCarthy at the Church of the Good Samaritan, in Corvallis, Oregon, where she had special responsibility for pastoring the Hispanic community as a fluent Spanish communicator, and was in charge of adult education programs.

In 2001, Jefferts Schori was elected and consecrated Bishop of Nevada.

She was awarded honorary Doctor of Divinity degrees from the Church Divinity School of the Pacific in 2001, Seabury-Western Theological Seminary in 2007, and Sewanee: The University of the South in 2008.

In 2003, Jefferts Schori voted to consent to the election of Gene Robinson, an openly gay and partnered man, to which some conservative Episcopalians objected.

Election as Presiding Bishop

The Episcopal Church met in General Convention in Columbus, Ohio, in June 2006. Jefferts Schori was elected to serve a nine-year term as Presiding Bishop by the House of Bishops, on June 18, from among seven nominees on the fifth ballot with 95 of the 188 votes cast. The House of Deputies, consisting of deacons, priests and laity, overwhelmingly approved the House of Bishops' election later that day. Jefferts Schori was the first woman primate in the worldwide Anglican Communion and the 26th Presiding Bishop of the Episcopal Church.

Although Jefferts Schori's election was an indication of widespread support in the Episcopal Church in the United States for ordaining women to the historical episcopate, the Diocese of Fort Worth, which opposed women in holy orders, asked the Archbishop of Canterbury to be placed under the oversight of a different primate. As not all churches in the Anglican Communion uphold the ordination of women, the election of a woman as primate also proved controversial in some other provinces.

At a news conference on June 18, 2006, the Presiding Bishop-elect articulated a willingness to work with conservatives. She expressed her hope to lead the church in the reign of God, rooted in imagery from Isaiah and including such United Nations Millennium Development Goals as eradicating poverty and hunger: "The poor are fed, the Good News is preached, those who are ostracized and in prison are set free, the blind receive sight."

Jefferts Schori became Presiding Bishop on November 1, 2006, and her investiture was held on November 4 at Washington National Cathedral. Her official seating was held the following day, also at the National Cathedral.

Jefferts Schori was the 963rd bishop consecrated in the Episcopal Church. She was consecrated by Jerry A. Lamb, Bishop of Northern California; Robert Louis Ladehoff, Bishop of Oregon; and Carolyn Tanner Irish, Bishop of Utah.

Presiding Bishop 
In 2008, groups from four dioceses (Fort Worth, Pittsburgh, Quincy, and San Joaquin) broke off to become part of the Anglican Church in North America as part of the Anglican realignment. Jefferts Schori authorized lawsuits against departing dioceses and parishes, with $22 million spent as of 2011. She also established a policy that church properties were not to be sold to departing congregations.

Jefferts Schori supported same-sex relationships and of the blessing of same-sex unions and civil marriages. Like her predecessor, she is a supporter of abortion rights, stating that "We say it is a moral tragedy but that it should not be the government's role to deny its availability." She also supported the US Department of Health and Human Services (HHS) mandate on birth control. In 2007, her church's blessing of same-sex marriage led 7 Anglican archbishops to refuse communion with her during a meeting in Tanzania.

Some within the church questioned the orthodoxy of her theology. For example, her statement that "the great Western heresy – is that we can be saved as individuals, that any of us alone can be in right relationship with God" in her opening address to the 2009 General Convention was criticized and prompted a clarifying statement from her in the following week. In 2013, Jefferts Schori's sermon in Curaçao about Paul driving out a demon from a slave girl, drew criticism from conservative Christian websites for departing from the common literal interpretation.

End of term
Jefferts Schori announced on September 23, 2014, that she would not seek another term as Presiding Bishop.  On June 27, 2015, the General Convention elected Bishop Michael Curry of North Carolina as the 27th Presiding Bishop of the Episcopal Church.

From 2017 to 2019, Jefferts Schori was an assisting bishop in the Episcopal Diocese of San Diego.

See also

 List of presiding bishops of the Episcopal Church in the United States of America
 List of Episcopal bishops of the United States
 Historical list of the Episcopal bishops of the United States

References

Further reading
The Episcopal Church Annual. Morehouse Publishing: New York, NY (2005).
Q & A With Bishop Jefferts Schori from The Living Church magazine
Katharine Jefferts Schori, A Wing and a Prayer: A Message of Faith and Hope. New York: Morehouse Publishing (January 2007)  and London: SPCK (April 2007) 
Katharine Jefferts Schori, The Heartbeat of God: Finding the Sacred in the Middle of Everything. Woodstock, Vermont: SkyLight Paths Publishing (October 2010).

External links

 Episcopal Church elects first woman Presiding Bishop — Episcopal News Service
 News article on her taking her leave from the Church of the Good Samaritan
 In Their Own Words: Katharine Jefferts Schori — Witness Magazine
 Interview with the Rt. Rev. Katharine Jefferts Schori, Bishop of Nevada — Witness Magazine
 Into the Breach: Interview with Bishop Katharine Jefferts Schori — Guardian UK
 State of the Church: Questions for Katharine Jefferts Schori - New York Times Magazine
 Katharine Jefferts Schori Oral History Interview

1954 births
Converts to Anglicanism from Roman Catholicism
American people of Swedish descent
Women Anglican bishops
21st-century Anglican bishops in the United States
Living people
Oregon State University alumni
Stanford University alumni
People from Corvallis, Oregon
People from Pensacola, Florida
Presiding Bishops of the Episcopal Church in the United States of America
American oceanographers
Church Divinity School of the Pacific alumni
Women Anglican primates
Oregon State University faculty
Episcopal bishops of San Diego
Episcopal bishops of Nevada